Per Hjertquist and Steve Krulevitz were the defending champions, but did not participate together this year.  Hjertquist partnered Peter Feigl, losing in the semifinals.  Krulevitz partnered John Feaver, losing in the final.

Steve Meister and Van Winitsky won the title, defeating Feaver and Krulevitz 3–6, 6–3, 6–3 in the final.

Seeds

  Tom Okker /  Dick Stockton (first round)
  John Feaver /  Steve Krulevitz (final)
  Peter Feigl /  Per Hjertquist (semifinals)
  Steve Meister /  Van Winitsky (champions)

Draw

Draw

External links
 Draw

Tel Aviv Open
1981 Grand Prix (tennis)